Cherkessk is the capital city of Karachay-Cherkessia, Russia, as well as its political, economic, and cultural center. Population: 

It was previously known as Batalpashinskaya (until 1931), Batalpashinsk  (until 1934), Sulimov (until 1937), Yezhovo-Cherkessk (until 1939).

Names
In Russian, the city is called  (Čerkessk) and has similar names in the languages of the city's other major ethnic groups.

For its first century of existence, Cherkessk was a stanitsa, a village inside a Cossack host, which from 1825 to 1931 was named Batalpashinskaya stanitsa (Russian:  Batalpašinskaja stanica) and nicknamed Pashinka ( Pašinka)  In 1931, it was renamed Batalpashinsk ( Batałpašinsk), and then in quick succession Sulimov ( Sulimov) in 1934 for Daniil Sulimov, Chairman of the Council of People's Commissars of the Russian SFSR, and following Sulimov's execution in the Great Purge, Yezhovo-Cherkessk ( Ježovo-Čerkessk) in 1937 for Nikolai Yezhov, head of the NKVD.  With Yezhov's arrest, the initial "Yezhovo-" was dropped, and the city received its present name in 1939.

History

What is now Cherkessk was established in 1804 as a Russian military fort on the Kuban River, what was then the border with Circassia, on the spot where in 1790 Russian troops under the command of General Johann Hermann von Fersen (Ivan Ivanovich Herman fon Fersen) defeated the Ottoman Batal Pasha.  In honor of the victory over Batal Pasha, the fort was named Batalpashinskaya; it was a redoubt surrounded by an earthen rampart and ditch.  (That the fort was named for an enemy leader may have led villagers to prefer the nickname Pashinka.)

The settlement itself was founded as the Cossack stanitsa of Batalpashinskaya near the Russian Army outpost.  The officially recognized year of founding of Batalpashinskaya and modern Cherkessk is 1825.  However, the Cossack settlers from the Khopyour and Kuban regiments began arriving in the newly organized stanitsa not earlier than spring of 1826. In 1860, the village was designated as the administrative center of the Batalpashinsky Otdel of the Kuban Oblast.  A decree of 30 December 1869 by Tsar Alexander II transformed the village into a city of Batalpashinsk but the decree was never implemented, and Batalpashinskaya remained a stanitsa until the Soviet times.  In 1888, the village became a seat of one of Kuban's seven otdels.

In 1922, the village became the seat of the Karachay-Cherkess Autonomous Oblast of the RSFSR, and in 1926, the Cherkess National Okrug.  In 1931, it was granted town status and renamed Batalpashinsk.  It received its current name of Cherkessk in 1939.  The city was occupied by the Nazi German Wehrmacht during World War II (the Great Patriotic War) from 11 August 1942 to 17 January 1943 as part of the Case Blue offensive.  In 1957, it became the capital of the reformed Karachay-Cherkess Autonomous Oblast which became the Karachay–Cherkess Republic in 1991 with the fall of the Soviet Union.

Administrative and municipal status
Cherkessk is the capital of the republic. Within the framework of administrative divisions, it is incorporated as the city of republic significance of Cherkessk—an administrative unit with the status equal to that of the districts. As a municipal division, the city of republic significance of Cherkessk is incorporated as Cherkessk Urban Okrug.

Population

The population of Cherkessk was 129,069 in the 2010 Census, 116,244 in the 2002 Census and 113,060 in the 1989 Soviet Census.

Ethnic groups
The city is inhabited by Russians, native Cherkess (Circassians), Karachays, Abaza, Nogays and minorities of Ukrainians, Greeks and Armenians.

1926
According to the First All-Union Census of the Soviet Union of 1926, inhabitants of Batalpashinsk (present-day Cherkessk) included:
Russians (82.7%)
Ukrainians (9.0%)
Karachays (0.8%)
Greeks (Pontic Greeks) (0.2%)

1939
The 1937 census results were suppressed and destroyed but the Soviet census of 1939 recorded:
Russians (87.6%)
Ukrainians (3.6%)
Abazins (1.5%)
Adyghes (i.e. Cherkesses) (1.4%)
Karachays (0.8%)
Ossetians (0.5%)
Nogais (0.5%)
Greeks (0.5%)

1959
The Soviet census of 1959 recorded:
Russians (87.7%)
Ukrainians (2.8%)
Cherkesses (2.1%)
Abazins (1.8%)
Karachays (1.6%)
Nogais (0.4%)
Greeks (0.4%)
Ossetians (0.4%)

1970
The Soviet census of 1970 recorded:
Russians (74.5%)
Cherkesses (6.4%)
Karachays (6.2%)
Abazins (5.0%)
Ukrainians (2.1%)
Nogais (1.0%)
Greeks (0.5%)
Ossetians (0.5%)

1989
According to the 1989 data from the final Soviet census, the population of the city included:
Russians (67.8%)
Cherkesses (9.0%)
Karachays (7.8%)
Abazins (6.5%)
Ukrainians (2.2%)
Nogais (1.2%)
Ossetians (0.5%)
Greeks (0.5%)

2002
In 2002, the Russian census reported the population including:
Russians (55.5%)
Karachays (13.8%)
Cherkesses (12.6%)
Abazins (8.1%)
Nogais (1.5%)
Ukrainians  (1.3%)
Ossetians (0.6%)
Greeks (Pontic Greeks) (0.4%)
Other (6.1%)

2010
In 2010, the population included:
Russians (54.7%)
Karachays (16.4%)
Cherkesses (13.2%)
Abazins (8.2%)
Nogais (1.5%)
Other (6.0%)

Education

Cherkessk is home to the following education institutions:
North Caucasian State Academy: civil engineering, mechanical engineering, energy engineering, business management, accounting, finance, medical school. www.kchgta.ru
Moscow Social Open University (branch)
Moscow Modern Arts Institute (branch)
Rostov State Economic University (branch)
Karachay-Cherkess State College
Daurov Art College: art, interior design, music, choreography divisions
Republican Children Art School: music, art, choreography divisions

Culture

Drama Theater: ethnic, modern and classical plays
State Philharmonic: classical and ethnic orchestra performances
Elbrus State Ensemble: ethnic North Caucasian dances, dance studio
Ensemble of Cossack Dance and Song: ethnic performances

Notable people
 David Safaryan, World champion in weightlifting representing Armenia

References

Notes

Sources

External links
Official website of Cherkessk 
Cherkessk Business Directory 

 
Populated places established in 1825
1825 establishments in the Russian Empire
Kuban Oblast